Enveriye Railway Station is a railway station in Eskişehir. It services trains from Istanbul Haydarpaşa Terminal heading south on the Eskişehir–Konya Railway Line. Due to the opening of the Ankara–Istanbul high-speed railway in 2014, conventional trains no longer operate on the Istanbul–Denizli and Istanbul–Konya–Adana–Gaziantep routes. For this reason, the station does not currently serve any trains.

External links
http://www.tcdd.gov.tr/yolcu/anahattrenleri.htm

Buildings and structures in Eskişehir Province
Railway stations opened in 1894
Railway stations closed in 2014
Railway stations in Eskişehir Province